The 1968–69 season was Colchester United's 27th season in their history and their first season back in the fourth tier of English football, the Fourth Division following relegation the previous season. Alongside competing in the Fourth Division, the club also participated in the FA Cup and the League Cup.

In a transitional season under new manager Dick Graham, Colchester missed an instant return to the third tier by four points, finishing the season in sixth place. The U's were eliminated at the second round of both FA and League Cups.

Season overview
Colchester appointed former Crystal Palace manager Dick Graham to replace Neil Franklin. Having guided Palace from the Fourth Division to the Second Division, Graham intended to emulate his work at Selhurst Park.

Seven games into the season, with his side earning just one point, Graham cleared out the squad, ousting six players and sold Duncan Forbes and Derek Trevis for a combined fee of £19,000. He brought in a number of players, including goalkeeper Tony Macedo and former Tottenham Hotspur double-winner Terry Dyson. Colchester's form drastically improved, earning 33 points from a possible 42 to propel up the table into fourth position and the promotion places. However, after a poor Easter period, earning just two points against promotion-rivals Bradford City, Halifax Town and Swansea Town saw the U's slip back into sixth place and four points short of promotion.

Players

Transfers

In

 Total spending:  ~ £30,000

Out

 Total incoming:  ~ £21,000

Loans in

Loans out

Match details

Fourth Division

Results round by round

League table

Matches

League Cup

FA Cup

Squad statistics

Appearances and goals

|-
!colspan="14"|Players who appeared for Colchester who left during the season

|}

Goalscorers

Disciplinary record

Clean sheets
Number of games goalkeepers kept a clean sheet.

Player debuts
Players making their first-team Colchester United debut in a fully competitive match.

See also
List of Colchester United F.C. seasons

References

General
Books

Websites

Specific

1968-69
English football clubs 1968–69 season